Alfred John Walters (November 5, 1892 – June 3, 1956) born in San Francisco, California, was a catcher in Major League Baseball for the New York Yankees (1915–18), Boston Red Sox (1919–23) and Cleveland Indians (1924–25).

Biography
He was born on November 5, 1892 in San Francisco, California.

In 11 seasons he played in 498 Games and had 1,426 At Bats, 119 Runs, 317 Hits, 41 Doubles, 6 Triples, 117 RBI, 13 Stolen Bases, 97 Walks, .222 Batting Average, .281 On-base percentage, .259 Slugging Percentage, 370 Total Bases and 58 Sacrifice Hits.

He died on June 3, 1956 in Alameda, California, at the age of 63.

Sources

1892 births
1956 deaths
Baseball players from California
Major League Baseball catchers
New York Yankees players
Boston Red Sox players
Cleveland Indians players
Saskatoon Quakers (baseball) players
Waco Navigators players
Mission Bells players